The Russian cruiser Minin was an armored cruiser built for the Imperial Russian Navy during the 1860s and 1870s. She was renamed Ladoga in 1909 when converted to a minelayer. The ship was sunk in 1915 when she struck a mine laid by a German submarine in the Baltic Sea.

Design and description
Originally designed as a sister ship to the broadside ironclad , the navy was dissatisfied with that ship as it believed that foreign developments had made her obsolete. So the ship was redesigned as a low-freeboard twin-turret ship with full rigging, much like the ill-fated British ship . Already launched when Captain capsized in a storm in 1870, Minin was reconstructed as an armored cruiser with her armament on the broadside and improved machinery.

She displaced  at deep load. Her hull was sheathed with copper to reduced biofouling and her crew numbered approximately 545 officers and men.

Minin had a vertical compound steam engine that drove a single propeller, using steam provided by a dozen cylindrical boilers. She was ship-rigged with three masts. To reduce drag while under sail, the single funnel could be lowered.

The ship had four , a dozen  and four  rifled breech-loading guns. She had a complete waterline belt of wrought iron that ranged in thickness from  amidships to 6 inches at the ends of the ships.

Construction and career
Minin, named after Kuzma Minin, was laid down by Baltic Works in Saint Petersburg on 24 November 1864 as a turret ship armed with four  gun in two turrets and four 6-inch guns. The ship was launched on 3 November 1869 and began a complete reconstruction the following year. Minin was finally completed in 1878.

In 1885 Minin had a rather unusual docking in the Dutch East Indies. When she required a dry dock, she was not allowed to dock in Singapore, reportedly because her draft was too high. In April she then reached Onrust Island near Batavia, where the Dutch Navy had Onrust Dock of 5,000 tons. This was then occupied by the ironclad Prins Hendrik. As the name implies, this dock would normally not be able to lift Minin. However, the draft of Minin could be lessened to 23.5 feet by unloading her guns, ammunition, sailing equipment and the like. This would also bring down her weight. In May Minin was indeed unloading, and in June she occupied the dock while Koningin Emma was waiting her turn.

The ship was converted into a minelayer in 1909–11 and renamed Ladoga. Her rigging was reduced to 2 pole masts, her armament was reduced to four  guns, and she could carry 1000 mines.

Notes

Footnotes

References

 

Naval ships of Russia
Ships built at the Baltic Shipyard
1869 ships
Cruisers of the Imperial Russian Navy
Maritime incidents in 1915
Ships sunk by mines
World War I shipwrecks in the Baltic Sea